Eli Jones (1850–1933) was an American medical doctor.

Eli Jones may also refer to:

 Eli Jones (Quaker) (1807–1890), American Quaker preacher.
 Eli Jones (academic), American academic and entrepreneur.

See also 
 Eli and Sybil Jones House